Léo Staats (1877 - 1952) was a French dancer, choreographer and director.

Life and career
Léo Staats studied ballet with Francis Merante, a dancer at the Paris Opera, and reportedly  made his debut in 1887. In 1908 he became Ballet Master at the Paris Opera. From 1926-28 he served as the first choreographer for shows at the Roxy movie palace in New York City. His choreography style was described as Neo-classical.

Works
Selected works include:
La nuit de Valpurgis (Faust) (1908, Gounod)
Namouna (1908, Lalo)
Javotte (1909, Saint-Saëns)
Espana (1911, Chabrier)
Les folies françaises ou Les Dominos (1911, Couperin)
Les abeilles (1917, Stravinsky)
Taglioni chez Musette (1920, Auber, Boieldieu, Meyerbeer, Weckerlin)
Frivolant (1922, Poueigh)
Cydalise et le Chèvre-pied (1923, Pierné) 
La nuit ensorcelée (1923, Chopin)
Siang-Sin (1923, Huë)
Istar (1924, D'Indy)
Soir de fête (1925, Delibes)
Orphée (1926, Ducasse)
La prêtresse de Koridwen (1926, Ladmirault)
Impressions de music-hall (1926, Pierné)
L'écran des jeunes filles (1929, Roland-Manuel)
Le rustre imprudent (1931, Fouret)
Un jardin sur l'Oronte (1932, Bachelet)
Roselinde (1933, Hirschmann)
Le rouet d'Armor (1936, Piriou)
Iléana (1936, Bertrand)

References

French choreographers
French ballet masters
Ballet choreographers
Paris Opera Ballet étoiles
French male ballet dancers
1877 births
1952 deaths
Paris Opera Ballet artistic directors